Van Hornesville Falls is a waterfall located on Otsquago Creek north of Van Hornesvile, New York.

References

Waterfalls of New York (state)
Landforms of Herkimer County, New York
Tourist attractions in Herkimer County, New York